T. E. McDonald was an American football coach. He served as the head football coach at Sterling College in Sterling, Kansas for one season, in 1920, compiling a record of 0–7–1."
  McDonald was an alumnus of the University of Iowa.

Head coaching record

References

Year of birth missing
Year of death missing
Place of birth missing
Place of death missing
Sterling Warriors football coaches
University of Iowa alumni